Ayano Sato may refer to:

Ayano Sato (canoeist) (born 1996), Japanese slalom canoeist
Ayano Sato (singer) (born 1995), Japanese singer
Ayano Sato (speed skater) (born 1996), Japanese speed skater